Banana paper is a type of paper created from banana plant bark or banana peel fibers. Banana paper has a lower density, higher stiffness, higher disposability, higher renewability, and higher tensile strength compared to traditional paper. These qualities are due to the cellular composition of banana fiber, which consists of cellulose, hemicellulose, and lignin.

During the manufacturing process of banana paper, the fibers are ground until they appear similar to saw dust. Then, the fiber is washed to remove natural resins to create agricultural fiber. If the natural resins are not washed away, these resins would take away from the integrity of the paper. The process of pulping produces pulp to be used in the manufacturing of paper. This pulp is used to create post-consumer fiber (processed fiber). The post consumer fiber is combined with the agricultural fiber to make banana paper.

Development 
The earliest evidence of the use of banana stems as a source of fiber dates back to 13th century Japan. However, its popularity declined with the upsurge of silk and cotton fibers imported from China and India.

Banana paper was first patented in the United States on March 16, 1912 by Charles M. Taylor and Howard Kay Cook. They both learned that cellulose fiber can be easily removed from the waste of the banana plant, and that the fiber is well adapted to making durable paper. Taylor and Cook applied for the patent on March 16, 1912. The application was granted on May 2, 1916, and they received a lifetime patent. The patent is now expired.

Properties 
Raw banana paper has a coarse surface due to the presence of hemicellulose, lignin, and other waxy components in the fiber. Hemicellulose is located between and within the cellulose fibrils and is incorporated into the cellulose structure. The fiber or pulp with high hemicellulose content has a high maximum tensile strength and a low maximum tear index. The cellulosic fibers enclose the outside of cellulose fibers, acting as natural binders. Long wrapped fiber bundles are a key component of banana paper. Length is also a significant fiber property, as longer fibers contain more fiber joints. These fiber joints contribute to a stronger network of fibers. Long fiber manufactured papers usually have better strength properties than short fiber manufactured papers.

Banana fiber can vary in weight and thickness depending on the specific part of the banana stem used. Sturdy, thick fibers can be taken from the outer sheaths, and softer fibers can be extracted from the inner sheaths.

The properties of banana paper overall include a lower density, higher stiffness, higher disposability, higher renewability, and higher tensile strength compared to traditional paper.

Manufacturing process 
The paper can be handmade or produced by machinery. Both the handmade and machine processes have similar steps. First, banana stems are collected as they contain more than 4% fiber which can be used to manufacture banana paper. The fiber from the banana is removed and washed in order to eliminate natural resins that can decrease the strength and durability of the paper. The washed fibers are used to form a stronger fiber (agricultural fiber). Then, the process of pulping makes pulp used in the production of paper. This pulp is used to produce the post-consumer fiber and is mixed with the agricultural fiber. Lastly, the mixed fibers are either molded together by a deckle (a tool used for handmade processes of molding fibers) or a machine.

Environmental impact 
After bananas are harvested from plantations, the stems and trunks are usually discarded. However, these parts contain available sources of fibers. If the scrapped stems and trunks are utilized, this can lead to a decrease in synthetic fiber production. Synthetic fiber production requires extra energy, fertilizer, and chemicals. Banana paper does not require any chemicals to be used during manufacturing. Banana paper is also more durable and has a longer lifetime than conventional paper. Therefore, the manufacturing of banana paper does not add to environmental pollution. Banana paper reduces pollution by having lower disposal costs and less agricultural waste enter landfills and rivers. The production of banana paper uses less energy compared to traditional paper production as the traditional paper industry is one of the largest sources of energy consumption. Therefore, banana paper is less impactful on natural resources, such as forests.

Future of industry 
The global market size of banana paper is projected to reach 117.97 million by 2023, according to Technavio, a global market research firm. The banana paper market is expanding because of a growing number of uses for banana paper such as paper pens, business cards, greeting cards, notebooks, and other stationery items. The market is specifically expanding in Europe, North America, South America, and APAC (Asia-Pacific). The expanding banana paper market is further supported by its low production cost. Factors contributing to the low production cost include relatively inexpensive banana fiber extraction machinery and ease of operation of these machines by unskilled workers.

References

External links

 How Banana Paper is made

Paper